{{DISPLAYTITLE:C9H17N}}
The molecular formula C9H17N (molar mass: 139.24 g/mol, exact mass: 139.1361 u) may refer to:

 Azaspirodecane
 Quinolizidine (norlupinane, octahydro-2H-quinolizine)

Molecular formulas